Gillisia myxillae is a Gram-negative, rod-shaped and strictly aerobic bacterium from the genus of Gillisia which has been isolated from the sponge Myxilla incrustans from Friday Harbor in the United States.

References

Flavobacteria
Bacteria described in 2006